Spool may refer to:
Bobbin, a cylinder or reel on which a quantity of thread, yarn or wire is wound for use in a particular machine or device
Cable reel, used to carry various types of electrical wires
Spool (record label), active 1998–2008
Spool (software company), a software company that allows users to save video and text onto their mobile devices to view the content offline
Spool pin, a type of pin used in pin tumbler locks to prevent picking
Simultaneous Peripheral Operation On-Line, Spooling, a form of multi-programming for the purpose of copying data between different devices
The Spooler, an operating system enhancement that provided spooling facilities for some IBM computers
Spool (aeronautics), the unit of rotating components inside a jet engine
Spooling up, increasing RPMs and thrust in a jet engine after the throttle has been advanced